William Davidson (born  1883) was a Scottish footballer who played as an outside left, featuring for Queen's Park, Falkirk, Airdrieonians and St Mirren in the Scottish Football League, and for Middlesbrough and Everton in the English Football League, competing exclusively in the top division of both systems.

He was a member of the Falkirk teams that finished league runners-up in the 1907–08 and 1909–10 seasons, and experienced the same fate with Everton in 1911–12. He came from a well-off background and chose to play as an amateur for much of his career, a freedom which allowed him to join the Pilgrims exhibition team which toured North America in the autumn of 1909 before going back to Falkirk.

References

1880s births
20th-century deaths
Year of birth unknown
Year of death unknown
Scottish footballers
Footballers from Glasgow
Association football outside forwards
Arsenal F.C. players
Falkirk F.C. players
Airdrieonians F.C. (1878) players
Queen's Park F.C. players
St Mirren F.C. players
Everton F.C. players
English Football League players
Scottish Football League players